Get a Clue is a 1997 film based on the Newbery Medal-winning book The Westing Game.

The film draws young viewers into the strange mysteries encountered by 13-year-old Cassie and her sister, Angela Wexler. After moving into a new town, Turtle learns the house next door is the notoriously haunted Westing mansion. Discovering the body of the dead millionaire, Turtle attempts to solve the case in hopes of receiving a 20 million dollar reward. The live-action adventure stars Ashley Peldon, Diane Ladd, Sally Kirkland, and Ray Walston.

Cast
 Ray Walston as Sandy McSouthers, Barney Northrup, Julian R. Eastman and Sam Westing
 Ashley Peldon as Tabitha Ruth Wexler "Turtle" or "Alice" T.R 
 Diane Ladd as Berthe Erica Crow
 Sally Kirkland as Sydelle Pulaski
 Cliff De Young as Jake Wexler 
 Sandy Faison as Grace Wexler
 June Christopher as Judge J.J. Ford
 Lewis Arquette as Otis Amber
 Diane Nadeau as Angela Wexler
 Billy Morrissette as Ed Plum
 Jim Lau as James Shin Hoo
 Shane West as Chris
 Ernest Liu as Doug Hoo

External links
 

Films based on children's books
Films based on mystery novels
Films based on American novels
Films set in country houses
1997 films
1997 television films
1990s mystery films
Films directed by Terence H. Winkless
1990s English-language films